Naked War is a 2006 turn-based strategy video game for two players, developed by Ste and John Pickford.

In 2011 it was made free to download.

Gameplay
Each player takes the role of a military commander controlling a squad of four soldiers on an island. A player issues orders then hits the 'send' button to send the turn to his opponent, before watching the results on his PC. The opposing player receives the turn as an email attachment. Each turn takes about four minutes.

Reception

In 2011, it was listed in the book 1001 Video Games You Must Play Before You Die.

References

External links

2006 video games
Military combat simulators
Multiplayer video games
Video games developed in the United Kingdom
Video games set on fictional islands
Play-by-email video games
Turn-based strategy video games
Windows games
Windows-only games